The Battle of Ulubad was fought sometime between 9 March and early May 1403 at Ulubad between the rival sons of the Ottoman Sultan Bayezid I, Mehmed Çelebi and İsa Çelebi, during the first stages of the civil war known as the Ottoman Interregnum. The battle was a major victory for Mehmed, who occupied the Ottoman capital, Bursa, and became master of the Ottomans' Anatolian domains. İsa fled to Constantinople, while Mehmed proceeded to formally lay claim to the succession of Bayezid by an enthronement ceremony in Bursa, and by having his father's body buried there. By 18 May 1403, however, İsa returned to Anatolia with an army provided by their oldest brother, Süleyman Çelebi, ruler of Rumelia. İsa was again defeated and eventually killed after a series of battles by September.

References

Sources
 
 
 

1403 in Asia
Conflicts in 1403
Ulubad
History of Bursa Province
1400s in the Ottoman Empire